Plescop is a commune in the Morbihan department of Brittany in north-western France.

Population
Inhabitants of Plescop are called in French Plescopais.

Map

Breton language
The municipality launched a linguistic plan through Ya d'ar brezhoneg on 28 January 2005.

In 2008, 11.45% of the children attended the bilingual schools in primary education.

See also
Communes of the Morbihan department

References

External links

 Mayors of Morbihan Association 

Communes of Morbihan